Skyborry Green is a hamlet consisting of a small number of houses and a farm in Shropshire, England,  northwest of Knighton. The hamlet population taken at the 2011 census can be found under Llanfair Waterdine. The Welsh border lies very close.

The name is an anglicisation of the Welsh for barn - ysgubor.

Skyborry Green lies at between 180m and 200m above sea level on the northern (English) side of the Teme valley. Nearby is Monaughty Poeth farm. The River Teme runs to the south of the hamlet. The Welsh border roughly follows the river here.

To the northwest is the small village of Llanfair Waterdine and the Welsh village of Knucklas, which has an ancient castle mound monument and railway station, is to the west.

See also 
Skyborry
Listed buildings in Llanfair Waterdine

References

External links

Villages in Shropshire